Beaumont Hills is a suburb of Sydney, in the state of New South Wales, Australia 40 kilometres north west of the Sydney central business district, in the local government area of The Hills Shire. Beaumont Hills is part of the Greater Western Sydney region and the Hills District.

History
Developed as a low-density residential suburb, Beaumont Hills was formerly part of the suburb of Kellyville. In 2002, Beaumont Hills became a separate suburb, as did Kellyville Ridge.

Heritage listings 
Beaumont Hills has a number of heritage-listed sites, including: 
 Windsor Road: White Hart Inn Archaeological Site

Demographics
According to the 2016 census, there were 9,042 residents in Beaumont Hills. 59.6% of people were born in Australia. The next most common countries of birth were India 4.4%, Philippines 4.1%, England 3.2%, China 2.8% and South Africa 2.6%. 64.8% of people only spoke English at home. Other languages spoken at home included Mandarin 3.8%, Hindi 2.5%, Cantonese 2.0%, Tagalog 2.0% and Persian 1.9%. The most common responses for religious affiliation were Catholic 32.2%, No Religion 16.4% and Anglican 13.5%.

Residential areas
Beaumont Hills was developed in the early 2000s adopting its name sake in 2003, suburb featuring a number of housing estates. 'The Sanctuary' located to the west is fronted by a natural creek reserve. 'The Outlook' is at the centre. The suburb is developed with a range of house styles. Turkey Nest Park on the highest point has panoramic views all the way to the Blue Mountains.

Commercial area
Beaumont Hills Shopping Centre officially opened in September 2009.

Public transport
Hillsbus provide several bus routes that run through Beaumont Hills (Mungerie Road, The Parkway, Brampton Drive) on a regular basis.

Hillsbus 

 Route 617  – 
 Route 633  – 
 Route 715  – 
 Route 664 is a Rouse Hill to Parramatta service, which stops at Beaumont Hills, however, the route goes via Kellyville, Bella Vista, the North-West T-Way and Westmead before it reaches Parramatta. The service from Parramatta can be taken from Beaumont Hills to the Rouse Hill Town Centre.
 Route 601 operates from Sanctuary Drive to Parramatta via Windsor Rd and Baulkham Hills.

The transport interchange at Rouse Hill Town Centre provides bus routes to many other places, including Windsor, Blacktown and Riverstone, operated by Hillsbus and Busways.

Sydney Metro Northwest 
The Sydney Metro Northwest opened 26 May 2019. Trains are operating every four minutes in peak times, with a potential for trains to operate for every two minutes.

References

External links
 History of Beaumont Hills
 Living in Beaumont Hills

Suburbs of Sydney
The Hills Shire
Populated places established in 2002
2002 establishments in Australia